"Érin grá mo chroí" ("Ireland, love of my heart", Roud 14056) is an Irish folksong that tells of emigration from Ireland.

References

Irish folk songs
Macaronic songs